Forsaken Gods is a standalone expansion for Gothic 3. It was developed by Trine Games and published by JoWooD Productions.  The game was released in Europe and North America in 2008. An Enhanced Edition was released in 2011 developed by Mad Vulture Games.

Gameplay 
Gameplay in Forsaken Gods is like in Gothic 3, with some small differences. The fight system has changed, now being based on Endurance. The gameplay area in Forsaken Gods has been restrained from the 3 parts in Gothic 3, to just one part – Myrtana. The main plot is concentrated only in this area.

Plot 
After awakening from a coma, the nameless hero must find a way to unite the continent, as it has been divided by numerous factions, many of which are aided or led by the Nameless Hero's former companions. Through his own means, the Hero must reunite Myrtana as to finally restore the land to peace and prosperity.

Reception 

Gothic 3: Forsaken Gods received "generally unfavorable reviews" according to the review aggregation website Metacritic. It was largely the result of excessive bugs in release which to date has not been entirely resolved by patching.

Updates 
In November 2010, JoWooD Entertainment announced that Mad Vulture Games would work on additional improvements for the game. The first patch was announced for Q1 2011.

On 22 March 2011, JoWooD Entertainment released the new patch via Steam, integrated within the new boxed version for the game titled Gothic 3: Forsaken Gods Enhanced Edition. The major patch is also available as a free download.

The final version, 2.01.08, was officially released through the Mad Vulture Games website on 18 December 2011, and made available for free download similarly to the previous versions.

References

External links 
 

Role-playing video games
Open-world video games
Video game expansion packs
Windows games
Windows-only games
Video games developed in Germany
Video games developed in Austria
Gothic (series)
JoWooD Entertainment games
2008 video games